Kollam district, earlier called Quilon district, is one of the 14 districts of Kerala state, India. The district is representative of all the natural attributes of Kerala states, and is endowed with a long coastal region, a major sea port on the Arabian Sea, plains and the mountains, lakes, lagoons and Kerala Backwaters, forests and the farm land, and rivers and streams. The area had mercantile relationship with Phoenicians and the Romans.

There is a variety of education institutions within the Kollam district including: medical and engineering colleges, business management, architectural institutes and state institutes dealing with fashion, design, construction and marine studies. The Thangal Kunju Musaliar College of Engineering in Karikode is the first government aided engineering institution after India's independence and is the first of its kind in the state. Mount Carmel Anglo-Indian School and the Infant Jesus Anglo-Indian School are among the state's oldest prominent educational institutions, situated at Tangasseri.

There are several prominent arts and science, law, engineering and management education institutions situated at the heart of the city namely Fatima Mata National College, SN College, SN Law College, Bishop Jerome Institute.
There are also 3 prominent medical institutions within the district; Government Medical College kollam in Parippally,[4] Travancore Medical College Hospital in Mevaram and Azeezia Medical College in Meeyannoor that encompasses all medical teaching within the district.

Mount Carmel Anglo-Indian School and Infant Jesus Anglo-Indian School are two of the state's oldest famous educational schools, both located in Tangasseri. Amrita Vishwa Vidyapeetham operates schools of arts and sciences, ayurveda, biotechnology, business, engineering, and social work in Amritapuri, Kollam metropolitan area. Kendriya Vidyalaya is situated at Ramankulangara, Chinmaya Vidyalaya at Chandanathope, Jawahar Navodaya Vidyalaya at Kottarakkara. Within engineering institutions the Thangal Kunju Musaliar College of Engineering in Karikode is a government aided institution that was established after India's independence and is the first of its kind in the state.

The state owned institutions including the Indian Institute of Infrastructure and Construction in chavara, Institute of Fashion Technology Kerala, Kerala Maritime Institute and Kerala State Institute of Design [ currently range on the outskirts of Kollam City.  Vocational training and skill development within Ayurveda Panchakarma Therapy, Spa Therapy, Cosmetology and Ayurvedic Massage provide diploma courses that enable participants to extend upon their knowledge associated with the disciplines.

Apart from colleges, there are a number of bank coaching centres in Kollam city. It's been categorised as India's hub for bank test coaching centres with approximately 40 such institutes. The student demographic for the centres range from a variety of Indian states including Tamil Nadu, Karnataka, Andhra Pradesh, Bihar and Madhya Pradesh.

Professional Colleges

Engineering and Technology Colleges

 Thangal Kunju Musaliar College of Engineering, Kollam, Karikode (first government-aided engineering college of the state)
 College of Engineering, Karunagappally (first government engineering college in the district, under IHRD)

 College of Engineering, Perumon
 College of Engineering, Kottarakkara
 College of Engineering, Pathanapuram
Private Self-Financing Engineering Colleges
 Basilous Mathew II College of Engineering, Sasthamcottah
 Bishop Jerome College of Engineering and Technology, Kollam
 Hindustan College of Engineering, Arippa, Kulathuppuzha
 MES Institute of Technology And Management, Chathannoor
 SHM Engineering College, Kadakkal
 TKM Institute of Technology, Karuvelil
 Travancore Engineering College, Roadvila, Oyoor
 UKF College of Engineering and Technology, Meenambalam
 Younus College of Engineering and Technology, Pallimukku
 Younus College of Engineering for Women, Kottarakkara, Kollam
 Younus Institute of Technology, Kannanalloor
 Pinnacle College of Engineering, Anchal, Kollam
 Amrita Institute of Technology and Science, Vallikavu, Clappana, Kollam

Medical Institutions

 Azeezia Medical College, Meeyannoor
 Travancore Medical College, Medicity, Kollam
 Government Medical College, Kollam and ESIC Hospital, Parippally, Kollam
 Sree Narayana Institute of Ayurvedic Studies and Research, Karimpinpuzha, Puthoor, Kollam
 Amrita Ayurveda Medical College, Karunagappally, Kollam

Business and Management Institutes

 TKM Institute of Management, Kollam
 Member Sree Narayana Pillai Institute of Management and Technology, Mukundapuram, Chavara, Kollam
 Bishop Jerome School of Management, Kollam
 Institute of Management-Kerala, Kollam
 Institute of Management-Kerala, Kundara
 Travancore Business Academy, Vadakkevila, Kollam
 Gurudev Institute of Management Studies (GIMS), Kadakkal
 Sankar Institute of Science, Technology and Management, Chathannoor
 Horizon Educational Foundation, Kollam
 Quilon Institute of Technology for Women, Kollam
 Gurudev Institute of Management Studies, Kadakkal
 Sankar Institute of Science Technology and Management, Chathanoor
 MSN Institute of Management and Technology, Mukundapuram PO, Chavara

Architecture Colleges
 Thangal Kunju Musaliar College of Engineering, Kollam, Karikode
 Nizar Rahim and Mark School of Architecture, Madannada, Kollam
 Bishop Jerome Institute, Karbala, Kollam

Design Institutes 
 Creative Institute of Fashion Technology, Kottiyam
 Creative Institute of Fashion Technology, Kottarakkara
 Venad Technical College, Kottarakkara
 Kerala State Institute of Design

Law Colleges
 Sree Narayana Guru College of Legal Studies, Kollam
 NSS Law College, Kottiyam

Nursing Colleges
 Bishop Benziger College of Nursing, Kollam
 Upasana College of Nursing, Kollam
 Travancore College of Nursing, Kollam
 Holy Cross College of Nursing, Kottiyam
 Azeezia Nursing College, Meeyannoor, Kollam
 Mercy College of Nursing, Kottarakkara, Kollam
 Vijaya College of Nursing, Kottarakkara, Kollam
 Vellapalli Natesan Shashtiabdapoorthi Smaraka College of Nursing, Kollam
 St. Joseph's College of Nursing, Kollam
 Royal College of Nursing, Chathannoor

Polytechnic Colleges

 Sree Narayana Polytechnic College, Kottiyam
 Government Polytechnic College, Punalur
 Government Polytechnic College, Ezhukone
 Model Polytechnic College, Karunagappally, Kollam

Fashion Technology Colleges
 Creative Institute of Fashion Technology, Kottiyam
 Creative Institute of Fashion Technology, Kottarakkara
 Venad Technical College, Kottarakkara
 Apparel Training and Design Center (ATDC Vocational College)
 Institute of Fashion Technology Kerala (IFTK), Vellimon, Kollam

MCA Colleges
 Mar Baselios Institute of Technology, Anchal
 Marthoma College of Science and Technology, Ayur
 Sree Narayana Institute of Technology, Vadakkevila, Kollam

Training and BEd Centres
 Badhiriya BEd. Training College
 Jamia Training College
 Valiyam Memorial College of Teacher Education
 Haneefa Kunju Memorial College of Education
 Sri Vidyadhiraja Model College of Teacher Education
 Millath College of Teacher Education, Sooranadu
 College of Teacher Education, Arkannoor, Ayur
 Sabarigiri College of Education, Anchal
 Fathima Memorial Training College, Mylapore
 Mannam Foundation Centre For Education Technology, Kollam
 Rama Vilasom Training College, Valakom
 Mannam Memorial Training College, Punalur
 Baselios Marthoma Mathews II Training College
 Fathima Memorial Training College, Pallimukku
 Karmela Rani Training College, Kollam
 Mount Tabor Training College, Pathanapuram
 Manjappara Educational And Charitable Trust BEd College

Arts and Science Colleges
 Sree Narayana College for Women, Kollam
 Fatima Mata National College, Kollam
 MMNSS College Kottiyam
 TKM College of Arts and Science, Kollam
 Sree Sankara Sanskrit Vithyapeedom College Edakkidom
 Devaswom Board College, Sasthamcotta
 IHRD College of Applied Science, Kundara
 Baby John Memorial Government College, Chavara
 St. John's College, Anchal
 St. Stephen's College, Pathanapuram
 St. Gregorios College, Kottarakkara
 NSS College, Nilamel
 Sree Narayana College, Punalur
 Sree Narayana College, Chathannur
 Sree Vidyadhiraja College of Arts and Science
 PMSA Pookoya Thangal Memorial Arts and Science College

List of Schools
This is a list of public and private educational institutions in the Kollam district of Kerala, India.

Department of Higher Education Schools

Kollam has a total of 129 educational institutions under the Department of Higher Education. The Meenakshi Vilasam Government Vocational Higher Secondary School (M.V.G.V.H.S.S.) is one of the oldest schools in the district; over 1,000 students study there.  B J S M Madathil Vocational Higher Secondary School tops the list of schools in the district in students strength, with about 2700 students studying there.

Higher secondary schools under DHSE
 Govt. BHSS, Chavara, Kollam
 Ayyankoyikkal HSS, Chavara, Mukundapuram, Kollam
 Govt. HSS, Karunagappally, Kollam
 Govt. Model Boys HSS, thevally, Kollam
 Govt. Boys HSS, Kottarakkara, Kollam
 Govt. HSS, Kulasekharapuram, Kollam
 Govt. HSS, Kuzhimathikad, Kollam
 Govt. HSS, Vellamanal, Kollam
 Govt. HSS, Bhoothakulam, Kollam
 Govt. HSS, Punalur, Kollam
 Govt. HSS, Valathungal, Kollam
 Govt. HSS, Vayala, Kollam
 Govt. HSS, Ottakkal, Kollam
 Govt. HSS, Karukone, Kollam
 Govt. HSS, West Kallada, Kollam
 Govt. HSS, Vallikeezhu, Kollam
 Govt. HSS, Panmanamanayil, Kollam
 Govt. HSS, Anjalummoodu, Kollam
 Govt. HSS, Mangad, Kollam
 Govt. HSS, Kummil, Kollam
 Govt. Fisheries HSS, Kuzhithura, Alappat, Kollam
 Govt. HSS, Sooraanad, Kollam
 Govt. MG HSS, Chadayamangalam, Kollam
 Govt. HSS, Anchal West, Kollam
 Govt. HSS, Sasthamkotta, Kollam
 Govt. HSS, Pallimon, Kollam
 Meenakshi Vilasom HSS, Peroor, Kollam
 Govt. VHSS, Pattazhi, Kollam
 Mohammeden Govt. HSS, Edathara, Kollam
 Govt. HSS, Kulathupuzha, Kollam
 Govt. Model HSS, Vettikkavala, Kollam
 Govt. Girls HSS, Thazhava, Kollam
 Govt. HSS, Chathannoor, Kollam
 Govt. HSS, Puthur, Kollam
 Govt. HSS, Thekkumbhagam, Paravur
 Guhanandapuram HSS, Chavara South, Kollam
 Amrutha Sanskrit HSS, Parippally, Kollam
 Milade Sherif HSS, Mynagappally, Kollam
 Odanavattom Girls HSS, Odanavattom, Kollam
 V V HSS, poredam, Kollam
 S.N. HSS, chithara, Kollam
 St. Gregorious HSS, Kottarakkara, Kollam
 S.M HSS, Kottara, Kollam
 S.M HSS, Patharam, Kollam
 B.J.S.M Madathil HSS, Thazhava, Kollam
 S.V HSS, Clappana, Kollam
 St. Antony's HSS, Kanjirakode, Kollam
 S.N.D.P.Y HSS, Neeravil, Kollam
 M.S.M HSS, Chathinamkulam, Kollam
 N.S.S HSS, Chathannoor, Kollam
 S.N.S.M HSS, Elampalloor, Kollam
 M.K.L.M. HSS, Kannanalloor, Kollam
 CP HSS, Kuttikkadu, Kollam
 Chempakassery HSS, Poothakulam, Kollam
 Irumpanangadu HSS, Irumpanangadu, Kollam
 Kristraj HSS, Kollam
 St. Stephen's HSS, Pathanapuram, Kollam
 E V HSS, Neduvathur, Kollam
 Dr CT Eapen Memorial HSS, Sasthamcotta, Kollam
 Ezhippuram HSS, Parippalli, Kollam
 Mayyanadu HSS, Mayyanadu, Kollam
 Vimala Hridaya Girls HSS, Kollam
 AKM HSS, Mailapur, Eravipuram, Kollam
 Thadikad HSS, Thadikad, Anchal, Kollam
 St. Goretti HSS, Punalur, Kollam
 Poovathoor HSS, Kottarakkara, Kollam
 St. Alosious HSS, Kollam
 N S S HSS, Prakkulam, Kollam
 Sivaram N S S HSS, Karikode, Kollam
 V.G.S.S Ambikodayam HSS, Kunnathoor East P.O, Kollam
 HSS, for Boys, Punalur, Kollam
 C V K M HSS, East Kallada, Kollam
 K P M E M HSS, Cheriyavelinelloor, Kollam
 M M HSS, Uppodu, East Kallada, Kollam
 B V HSS, Karunagappally, Kollam
 M M HSS, Nilamel, Kollam
 T K M HSS, Karikkode, Kollam
 Sree Narayana Trust HSS, Kollam
 S V R VHSS, Vendar, Kollam
 C S I Vocational HS&HSS, for Deaf, Valakom, Kollam
 St. Joseph's Convent HSS, Kollam
 St. Jude's HSS, Alumoodu, Mukhathala, Kollam
 St. Mary's HSS, Kizhakkekara, Kollam
 Vellimon HSS, Vellimon, Kollam
 VHSS, Manjappara, Kollam
 John F Kennady M HSS, Karunagappally, Kollam
 Lourd Matha HSS, Kovilthottam, Kollam
 Nehru Memorial HSS, Kaithakuzhy, Kollam
 Mount Carmel E M HSS, Mathilakom, Kollam
 St. John's HSS, Karuvelil, Ezhukone, Kollam
 S D A HSS, Kottarakkara, Kollam
 Sabarigiri HSS, Anchal, Kollam
 Mount Tabore HSS, Pathanapuram, Kollam
 R V HSS, Valakom, Kollam
 T V T M HSS, Veliyam, Kollam
 VHSS, Vayanakom, Kollam
 M A E M HSS, Karikkodu, Kollam
 Jawahar HSS, Ayur, Kollam
 A K M V HSS, Thadikkadu, Anchal, Kollam
 Govt. HSS, Koikkal, Kollam
 T K D M Govt. VHSS, Kadappakada, Kollam
 Govt. HSS, Peringalam, Kollam
 Govt. HSS, Ashtamudy, Kundara, Kollam
 Govt. VHSS, Punnala, Kollam
 Govt. HSS, Chithara, Kollam
 Govt. HSS, Muttara, Kottarakkara, Kollam
 Govt. HSS, Nedungolam, Paravur
 Govt. HSS, Oachira, Kollam
 Govt. HSS, Yeroor, Kollam
 Govt. HSS, Thevannoor, Kollam
 Govt. HSS, Thodiyoor, Kollam
 Govt. HSS, Kulakkada, Kottarakkara, Kollam
 Govt. HSS, Poruvazhy, Kunnathoor, Kollam
 Govt. VHSS, Kadakkal, Kollam
 Vakkanad Govt. HSS, Kottarakkara, Kollam
 Govt. HSS, Perinad, Kollam
 Govt.HSS, Anchal East, Kollam
 Sadanandapuram Govt. HSS, Kollam
 Govt. HSS, Quilon West, Kollam
 S N Trust HSS, Chathannoor, Kollam
 S N Trust HSS, Punalur, Kollam
 Technical HSS, Chadayamangalam, Kollam.
 D.V.V. HSS, Thalavoor, Pathanapuram, Kollam
 St. Thomas HSS, Punalur, Kollam
 M E S English Medium HSS, Panmanam, Kollam
 Sreeniketan HSS, Chathannoor, Kollam
 Sree Narayana E M HSS, Valiyakulangara, Oachira, Kollam
 Vivekananda HSS, Changankulangara, Kollam
 N.G.P.M. HSS, Venchempu, Punalur
 T C N M GHSS, Nedumpara
 Govt.VHSS, Kottankulangara
 G P VHSS, Perumkulam
 Govt.A S HSS, Puthanthura
 M G D HSS for Boys, Kundara
 M A M HSS, Chengamanadu
 M T D M HSS, Malur
 K N N M VHSS, Pavithreswaram
 Devi Vilasom VHSS, Thalavoor
 M T HSS Valakam, Kottarakkara
 M M HSS, Vilakkudy
 Adichanalloor Panchayath HSS, Adichanalloor
 H.K.M HSS, Kallukuzhi, Umayanalloor, Kollam
 The King's School, Kottiyam, Kollam

Institutions under Directorate of VHSE
 Govt. VHSS for Boys, Kottarakkara
 Govt. VHSS, Anchal East
 Govt. VHSS, Punnala
 Govt. VHSS for Girls, Kottarakkara
 Govt. VHSS, Cheriazheekal
 Technical High School, Ezhukone
 Govt. VHSS, Muttara
 Govt. VHSS, Karunagappally
 Govt. VHSS for Boys, Kollam
 Govt. VHSS, Kulakkada
 Govt. VHSS, Pattazhi
 Govt. VHSS, Kottankulangara
 Govt. VHSS, Chathanoor
 Govt. VHSS, Eravipuram
 Meenakshi Vilasom Govt. VHSS, Peroor, Kollam
 Govt. VHSS, Kadakkal
 T.K.D.M Govt. VHSS, Uliyakovil
 Govt. VHSS for Girls, Valathungal
 Govt. VHSS, Achancoil
 Govt. RFTH School, Karunagapally
 Edamon VHSS, Edamon
 K.S.M VHSS, Edavattom
 St.John's VHSS, Ummannoor
 St. George VHSS, Chowalloor, Edakkidom
 VHSS, Odanavattom
 Manjappara VHSS
 Jayajyothi VHSS, Poruvazhi, Ambalathumbhagam
 R VHSS, Valakom
 V VHSS, Ayathil
 Sri Vidyadiraja Memorial Model VHSS, Vendar
 B.J.S.M Madathil VHSS, Thazava
 Thadikkad VHSS, Thadikkad, Pathanapuram
 Matha VHSS, Vilakkumpara
 Vivekananda VHSS, Chadayamangalam, Poredam
 VHSS, Arkannur
 K.N Nair Memorial VHSS, Pavithreswaram
 T.E.M VHSS, Mylode
 Sivavilasam VHSS, Thamarakudy
 D.V VHSS, Thalavur, Kottarakkara
 A.K.M VHSS, Thadikad
 K.P.S.P.M VHSS, East Kallada
 V.S VHSS, Ezhukone
 I.G.M VHSS, Manjakkala
 J.E. Kennedy Memorial VHSS, Karunagappally
 A.P.P.M VHSS, Avaneeswaram
 D. VHSS, Mylom
 VHSS, Vellimon
 St.Michael VHSS Kumbalam, Mulavana
 Kuzhikkal Edavaka VHSS, Pavithreswaram, Karupinpuzha
 Vayanakom VHSS, Oachira
 NS VHSS, Valacode, Punalur
 SK VHSS, Thrikkannamangal, Kottarakkara

Schools affiliated to CBSE
 Kendriya Vidyalaya, Kollam.
 T.K.M. Centenary Public School, Kollam
 Sree Narayana Trust Central School, Kollam
 Sree Buddha Central School, Kurunagapally, Kollam
 K.N.S.M Sree narayana Central school kadaikodu Edakkidom
 National Public school, Thazhuthala, Mukhathala P.O, Kollam
 Lake Ford School, Kavanad, Kollam
 St. Mary's Residential Central School, Kavanad, Kollam
 B R Memorial Central School, Chethady, Kollam - Thirumangalam Highway, Chengamanadu
 A P R M Central School, Kizhukkumbagam, Chithara P.O, Kollam
 Sreeniketan Central School, Chathannoor Karamcodu P.O, Kollam
 Siddhartha Central School Pallimon, Kollam
 River De International School, Kulathupuzha, Kollam
 St. John's School, Anchal, Kollam
 Sree Narayana Central School, Nedungolam, Paravur
 St. George central School, Anchal, Kollam
 Nehru Memorial Model School, Kadakkal, Kollam
 Vimala Central School, Chathannoor, Kollam
 Toc H Residential Public School, Punalur, Kollam
 City Central School, Uliyakovil, Kollam
 Sabarigiri School Punalur, Kollam
 Mar Baselios School Maruthamonpally, Pooyappally, Kollam
 The Oxford School Village, Thazhuthala, Umayannalloor P.O, Kollam
 Chinmaya Vidyalaya, Chanthanathope, Kollam, Kerala
 Amrita Vidyalayam, Puthiyakavu, Karunagappally, Kollam
 Navdeep Public School, Vettilathazham, Decent Jn P.O, Kollam
 Sree Narayana Central School, Karunagappally, Kollam
 St. Gregorious Central School, Karunagappally, Kollam
 Divine Public School, Puthoor, Kollam
 Jawahar Navodaya Vidyalaya, Kottarakara, Kollam
 Aiswarya Public School, Kalakkode, Paravur
 St.Jude.Central School, Mukhathala, Kollam
 Fathima Public School, Punalur
 Travancore Devaswom Board central school, vettikavala)
 Sabarigiri English School, Anchal, Kollam
 Delhi Public School Kollam (DPS Kollam)
 Sri Sri Academy, Ezhukone ( SSA, Kollam )

Schools affiliated to ICSE 
 Amrita Vidyalayam
 Auxilium English Medium School
 Holy Trinity Anglo - Indian School
 Infant Jesus School Kollam
 Maria Agnes English Medium Convent School
 Mary Giri Vidya Mandir
 Mount Carmel Convent Anglo-Indian Girls High School
 Preshithamatha School
 St. Charles Borromeo Convent School, Chittayam
 St. Charles Borromeo Convent School, Thrikkannapuram
 St. John's Residential School
 St. Joseph's Convent School
 St. Joseph's Convent School and Junior College, Edamon
 St. Joseph International Academy
 St. Mary's Residential School
 St. Vincent's Convent School
 Trinity Lyceum School, Kollam
 Vimala Hridaya School

Schools affiliated to IGCSE (Cambridge) 
 The King's School, Kottiyam, Kollam

Education in Kottarakkara

Schools 
 creative institute of fashion technology , kottarakkara.
 venad technical college , kottarakkara.
 Mar Baselios English Medium School, Kottapuram,
 Sri Vidyadhiraja Memorial Model HSS, Vendar, Kottarakara.
 Govt. Boys' Higher Secondary School, Kottarakara,
 St. Gregorios High School, College Junction, Kottarakara,
 St. Gregorios Higher Secondary School, College Junction, Kottarakara
 Marthoma Girls' Higher Secondary School, Kottarakara
 St.Mary's HS, Kizhekketheruvu
 Mar Baselious English Medium School, Kottapuram
 Town UP school, Kottarakara
 MAMHS-Chengamanadu,
 MTMM LPS-Chengamanadu,
 Chethady UPS-Chengamanadu,
 BRM Central School -Chengamanadu,
 MGM Residential Public School -Mylom, Kottarakara,
 Govt. Model Higher Secondary School, Vettikavala.
 Carmel Residential Senior Secondary School, Kadalavila, Nellikunnam P.O.,
 KNNMVHSS, Pavithreswaram
 K .N .Sathyapalan Memorial Central school Edakkidom ഇടയ്ക്കിടം
 Divine Public School, Puthoor
 Easwara Vilasom Higher Secondary School, Neduvathoor
 Siddhartha Central School, Puthoor
 S K V V H S S, Thrikkannamangal
 Sreenarayana Guru Senior Secondary School, Ezhukone
 Mar Ivanios Bethany Secondary School, Kalayapuram
 MSCLPS, Neeleswaram
 DVUPS, Neduvathoor
 WLPS, Ambalappuram
 Veluthampi Memorial High School, Ambalappuram
 DVUPS, Annoor
 WLPS, Anakottoor
 Govt. HSS, Kaniyapoika, Puthoor
 St. George English Medium School, Puthoor
 Little Flower LPS, Kallumpuram, Puthoor
 Junior Technical School, Irumpanangadu
 S.V.V.H.S.S, Thamarakudy
 Seventhday Adventist Higher Secondary School, Karickom
 Sadanandapuram Govt. Higher Secondary School
 Jawahar Navodaya Vidyalaya, Kottarakkara

Colleges
 St. Gregorios College
 University Institute of Technology (UIT)
 IHRD College of Engineering, Thrikkannamangal
 Mercy college of Nursing, Valakom
 Vijaya Nursing College
 Sree Sankara Sanskrit Vidhyapeedom, Edakkidam (ഇടയ്ക്കിടം)

See also
 List of colleges affiliated to University of Kerala
 List of colleges affiliated with Cochin University of Science and Technology
 List of Engineering Colleges in Kerala
 List of Medical Colleges in Kerala
 List of Kollam District Schools

References

 
Lists of universities and colleges in Kerala
Schools in Kollam district
Lists of schools in Kerala